Abbas Abdi (born 1 October 1956) is one of Iran's most influential reformists, journalist, self-taught sociologist and social activist.

Biography 
Abdi was born in 1956. He studied polymer engineering at Tehran Polytechnic. He worked briefly in the foreign intelligence department of the prime minister's office of research and information, and served as the cultural deputy in the Center for Strategic Research under the president's office. He was a member of editorial board of the daily Salam. Abdi was a member of central council of Iran Participation Front, and is currently the chairman of the Association of Iranian Journalists.

He was the first person to storm the United States embassy in Tehran, along with other students, during the early years of the Iranian Revolution in 1979. In the following years, he became a critic of the political establishment of Iran. In 1993, he was imprisoned for eight months due to his critical writings in the reformist daily, Salam. He was a supporter of President Mohammad Khatami's reform plans, and one of the most influential figures in the reformist camp after 1997. He ran into legal trouble after the Iran student protests, July 1999 following the invasion of Tehran University dormitories, in which the police attacked the dormitory of the university because of student protests following Abdi's article in Salam.

Abdi became the director of the Ayandeh public opinion firm and participated in a poll asking Iranians if they supported resuming government dialogue with the United States. On 22 September 2002 the official news agency IRNA published an Ayandeh poll indicating that 74.4% of Iranians favoured a resumption of ties with the United States.  Abdi was arrested at his home on 4 November 2002, accused of "having received money from either the US polling firm Gallup or a foreign embassy".  Abdi spent several years in prison as a result. In the 2009 presidential election he was one of the key advisors to Mehdi Karoubi.

See also 
 Human rights in Islamic Republic of Iran
 2nd of Khordad Movement

References

External links 
 BBC News: Leading Iranian Reformist Arrested
 Time Europe: Interview with Abbas Abdi
 IRNA: Abbas Abdi Stand Trial Over Polling Case
 BBC News story. Reference to Abbas Abdi's Role in 1979 U.S. Embassy takeover in Tehran
 The New York Times: Hostage-Taker, Reformer, Pessimist: An Iranian Life

1956 births
Living people
Islamic Iran Participation Front politicians
Iranian journalists
20th-century Iranian engineers
Muslim Student Followers of the Imam's Line
Office for Strengthening Unity members
Members of the National Council for Peace